Julian Ranftl (born 17 February 1996) is an Austrian handball player for SG West Wien and the Austrian national team.

He participated at the 2018 European Men's Handball Championship.

References

1996 births
Living people
Handball players from Vienna
Austrian male handball players